Royal Oak Middle School is the only middle school in the Charter Oak Unified School District and is located in the City of Covina, California, in the San Gabriel Valley, east of Los Angeles. Royal Oak was a 1996 California Distinguished School

History
Royal Oak Middle School opened in 1985 on the site of the former Royal Oak High School, which opened in 1965. Originally, the middle school served students in sixth through eighth grades.  In 2007, the mission of the school changed to serve only seventh- and eighth-grade students.

Special programs
 Advancement Via Individual Determination
 Accelerated Reader
 Accelerated Math
 Gifted and Talented Education
 Positive Behavior Interventions and Supports
 Project Lead the Way 
 STEAM Academy

Enrollment

Enrollment in the 2016–2017 school year is 712. The majority of students are Hispanic, with a large white minority and smaller minorities of African Americans and Asian Americans.

References

Schools in Los Angeles County, California
Charter middle schools in California
Educational institutions established in 1927
1927 establishments in California